Shine is Mary Black's ninth studio album released in 1997, where she abandons her usual sound and production. The album was recorded in Los Angeles, California, United States, with a combination of local session musicians and members of her Irish band. On production was Larry Klein (who had worked with Peter Gabriel and Joni Mitchell), and he aided in selecting songs from a new crop of songwriters. Most notably, Mary Black sang five songs written by David Gray. Black dedicated the album to the memory of Dave Early "a true friend and a gifted musician".

Track listing
"Shine" (David Gray) (4:38)
"One and Only" (Scott Cutler, Annie Preven) (4:01)
"Almost Gone" (David Gray) (3:36)
"Nobody Lives Without Love" (Larry Klein, Tonio K.) (5:05)
"I Misunderstood" (Richard Thompson) (3:49)
"Trespass Shoes" (David Gray) (5:21)
"I Will Be There" with Paul Brady (Paul Brady, John O'Kane) (4:21)
"What Does It Matter" (David Gray) (4:17)
"Beautiful" (Amy Kanter) (4:14)
"Late Night Radio" (David Gray) (3:05)
"By the Hour" (Larry Klein, David Batteau) (4:19)
hidden track: "Two Dancers In the Dark" (Paul Buckley) (3:38)

Personnel
Mary Black - vocals, backing vocals
Jerry Marotta - drums, percussion
Garvan Gallagher - bass
Bill Shanley - electric guitar, acoustic guitar, electric high-strung guitar, mandolin
Pat Crowley - Hammond organ, accordion, piano
Frank Gallagher - fiddle, whistle, keyboards
Larry Klein - bass, bass guitars, drums, percussion, keyboards
Michael Landau - electric guitar
Greg Leisz - acoustic guitar, lap steel guitar, pedal steel guitar, baritone guitar. Weisenborn guitar solo on track 6
Jim Cox - Hammond organ
Technical
Carrie McConkey, Damien McCollum - production coordination
Gwendolen Cates - cover photography

References

External links
Mary-black.net
House-of-music.com

1997 albums
Mary Black albums
Albums produced by Larry Klein